Rowing at the 2019 Southeast Asian Games was held at Triboa Bay at Subic, Philippines from 6 to 8 December 2019.

Participating nations

Medal table

Medalists

Men

Women

References

External links
 Rowing results

2019 Southeast Asian Games events
2019